Nobles are members of a nobility.

Nobles may also refer to:

 Noble and Greenough School, a preparatory school in Dedham, Massachusetts, United States
 Nobles County, Minnesota, United States
 Nobles, Tennessee, an unincorporated community, United States
 Nobles a series of books written for the Forgotten Realms of Dungeons & Dragons
 Nobles: The Shining Host, a book for the Changeling: The Dreaming tabletop role-playing game

People with the surname
 Cliff Nobles (born 1944), American pop singer
 Gene Nobles (1913–1989), American radio disc jockey
 Gerald Nobles (born 1971), American boxer
Melissa Nobles, American political scientist and academic administrator
 Vada Nobles (21st century), American record producer and songwriter
William Nobles (disambiguation)
William Nobles (cinematographer), American cinematographer.
 William H. Nobles (1816-1876), American politician

See also
 Noble (disambiguation)